Bamanda is a village near Boudh in Boudh district of Odisha state of India.
The Naikpada Cave (Patali Srikshetra) is very close to Bamanda.

References

External links

Villages in Boudh district